"It Ain't No Crime" is a song written Tom Shapiro, Tony Martin, and Mark Nesler and recorded by American country music artist Joe Nichols.  It was released in December 2007 as the second and final single from Nichols’ 2007 album Real Things.  The song peaked at number 16 on the US Hot Country Songs chart and at number 5 on the Bubbling Under Hot 100.

Content
The song's narrator is a man who is trying to relax, but finds himself constantly distracted by other people who try to persuade him to get married and get a job. This central character defends his relaxed lifestyle by telling his peers that "it ain't no crime".

Critical reception
Kevin John Coyne of Country Universe gave it a B+ grade, saying the song needs a bit more edge but that Nichols "does well enough delivering this country boy’s slacker anthem."

Music video
The music video was directed by Kristen Barlowe and premiered in early 2008.

Chart performance
The song debuted at number 45 on the Hot Country Songs chart dated January 19, 2008.

References

2007 singles
Joe Nichols songs
Songs written by Mark Nesler
Songs written by Tom Shapiro
Songs written by Tony Martin (songwriter)
Show Dog-Universal Music singles
Song recordings produced by Brent Rowan
Song recordings produced by Mark Wright (record producer)
2007 songs
Songs about crime